This is an incomplete list of entertainment acts who appeared at the Jacksonville Veterans Memorial Coliseum from 1960 through 2003.

References

Culture of Jacksonville, Florida
Jacksonville Coliseum
Jacksonville, Florida-related lists
Jacksonville Coliseum
Jacksonville Coliseum